Tiago Abravanel (born Tiago Donato Abravanel Corte Gomes on October 21, 1987 in São Paulo, Brazil) is a Brazilian actor, voice actor and singer. He is the grandson of TV show host and owner of SBT, Silvio Santos.

Career

Filmography

References

External links

1987 births
Living people
Brazilian LGBT actors
Brazilian male television actors
Brazilian people of Greek-Jewish descent
Brazilian people of Turkish-Jewish descent
Jewish Brazilian male actors
Male actors from São Paulo
Big Brother (franchise) contestants
Big Brother Brasil